This is a list of characters that appear in the Shrek franchise and spin-offs from it.

Main characters

Shrek

Shrek (voiced by Mike Myers, Michael Gough as his official voice in the video games) is the lead character in all of the films. He is a big, green ogre that is characterised as being grumpy and temperamental, but also caring and brave. He begins the series as an unsociable hermit until he meets his soon-to-be best friend, Donkey. In a deal with Lord Farquaad, he and Donkey embark on a quest to save Princess Fiona from the castle in which she was confined. Despite their differences, Shrek and Fiona fall in love, marry at the end of the first film, and have three ogre babies in the third film. Chris Farley was originally cast to be the voice of Shrek, but he died before he could complete his voice work. He had finished 85-95% of his lines.

Donkey

Donkey (voiced by Eddie Murphy in the films, Mark Moseley in the video games, and Dean Edwards in Scared Shrekless) is a talking donkey. He escaped being sold by his owner, an old woman, and eventually met and allied with Shrek. He is Shrek's best friend, but always bothers or irritates the ogre. He has also become the frequent companion of the honorable mercenary Puss In Boots, although the two always fight or disagree with one another. Donkey loves to sing and hum, as seen in all the franchise films. He is also the Dragon's husband and father of the Dronkeys, whose passion for sweets inspired the name of each one of them.

Princess Fiona

Princess Fiona (voiced by Cameron Diaz, singing voice provided by Sally Dworsky in the first film, Renee Sands on all other occasions, and Holly Fields in the video games) is the princess of  the kingdom of Far Far Away, the daughter of late King Harold and Queen Lillian, cousin of King Arthur Pendragon, and Shrek's wife from the end of the first film on. She begins the series as a beautiful princess who transforms into an ogress every night when the sun sets. At the end of the first film, the transforming spell is broken and she permanently takes the form of an ogress when she realizes that Shrek is her true love. In Shrek 2, Fiona becomes human again, but later goes back to her ogress form permanently.

Puss In Boots

Puss in Boots (voiced by Antonio Banderas in the English, Spanish, and Italian versions of the films, Eric Bauza in The Adventures of Puss in Boots, vocal sounds and purrs provided by Frank Welker, and voiced by André Sogliuzzo in the video games and commercials) is Shrek's best friend along with Donkey. Loosely based on the fairy tale character Puss In Boots as well as being a kind of parody of Zorro, he is a smooth-talking cat with a Spanish accent, usually wearing a cavalier's hat, a belt with a sword, a small black cape, and small Corinthian leather boots. Puss first appears in Shrek 2, much like Dragon in the first film. He often overpowers his enemies by distracting them with his "cute kitten" looks. He also exhibits common cat behavior such as coughing up hairballs and chasing lights, usually resulting in his defeat or capture. He makes a non-speaking cameo in the musical.

The character was also featured in the 2011 film Puss in Boots and its sequel Puss in Boots: The Last Wish as the lead character.

Puss In Boots stars in the Netflix series The Adventures of Puss in Boots, where he protects the hidden city of San Lorenzo.

Kitty Softpaws
Kitty (voiced by Salma Hayek Pinault) is a black tuxedo cat. She has a white chest, whiskers, muzzle, tail-tip, eyebrows and white paws. Her eyes are bright blue. She wears a brown belt in which she carries a long dagger, along with dark brown boots. Her fur is very thick. Her paws do not have claws because they were removed by her former owners (the first in a line of people manipulating and abusing her), but this lends to her skill as an exceptional thief. She pretends to be Puss's friend, but it is revealed later that she was in cahoots with Humpty and Jack and Jill to steal the Golden Goose and trick Puss into being imprisoned in his home town. During their adventures, she falls in love with Puss, and eventually she saves him and helps him bring the Golden Goose back to the Great Terror. They start a relationship and eventually get engaged. However, when Kitty realized he was never going to truly love her as long as his ego got in the way, she bailed on the wedding, soon finding out he had also not shown up to the ceremony because he was afraid.

Some time later, Kitty is approached by Goldilocks and the Three Bears Crime Family over helping them steal a map to a 'Wishing Star' being delivered to 'Big' Jack Horner. Seeing this as her chance to wish for someone who she could actually trust, Kitty faked heading on a spiritual retreat, then snuck into the camp of the Snake Sisters to steal the map. However, her plan is thwarted by Puss, who was attempting to steal the map for himself after Goldilocks inadvertently revealed the Star's existence to him, forcing her to escape with the map along with him and Perrito, a 'therapy dog' following Puss around, when Jack and Goldilocks attempt to steal the map for themselves.

Initially reluctant to help Puss (as well as put off by Perrito's overly friendly nature), she eventually warms up to him again when, after and ambush by Jack and Goldilocks leads to the map falling into Goldi's hands, she discovers that Puss abandoned their wedding after developing a fear of commitment (something he never experienced before) and that he deeply regretted leaving and hurting her. They manage to steal the map back, but their escape is thwarted when Perrito is captured by Goldilocks and Puss is separated from Kitty by the Cave of Lost Souls, an obstacle created by the Star's magic. Kitty manages to save Perrito from Goldilocks' trap, however, she witnesses Puss hastily escaping from the Cave shortly after.

Unaware that Puss was being hounded by the specter of Death ever since losing his eighth life and that he was struggling to come to terms with being down to his last life, Kitty assumes Puss is attempting to use the Star's wish to regain his lost lives so he can maintain his reputation. However, after witnessing Death attack Puss on top of the star and seeing Puss finally let go of his ego (and later giving her the map and, consequently, the wish), she realizes that he is legitimately trying to change, and, with the help of a reformed Goldilocks, tears the map, causing the star to implode and crush Jack. In the aftermath, Puss tells Kitty that all he wishes for is to spend his life with her and they get back together. Alongside Perrito, they form Team Friendship and sail off to new adventures.

Secondary characters

Dragon

Dragon is depicted as a ruby-colored dragon, initially known as the guard of the tower in which Princess Fiona awaits her rescuer in the first film. She first emerges when Donkey accidentally disturbs her sleep as he’s looking for stairs to the highest room of the tallest tower. Angered by the disturbance, Dragon corners and confronts Donkey, who, not wanting to anger her further, begins to compliment her on the whiteness of her teeth and on her oral hygiene. She bats her eyelashes, and Donkey, realizing she’s female, proceeds to charm her into infatuation and falling in love with him. She still terrifies Donkey, however, even as he gracefully tries to decline her advances—at first of a relationship at all and then of a physical relationship. When Donkey suggests getting to know each other first, Dragon affectionately wraps a claw around his face but does not take his request seriously. Shrek arrives just as she’s about to kiss Donkey's lips. Shrek, Donkey, and Fiona escape, and Dragon is left chained to the tower’s grounds, devastated in unrequited love. Still, she is ingrained in Donkey’s mind, as discreetly indicated by later scenes in the film.

Dragon reappears toward the end of the film, when she and Donkey meet again, reconcile, help crash the marriage between Lord Farquaad and Fiona, and are shown as a couple at Fiona and Shrek’s wedding ceremony. They are shown as a married couple by the events of the sequel; her character has a major role as Donkey chooses to leave home on the grounds that she was behaving uncharacteristically ill-tempered, but is reunited with her husband towards the ending of the film when it appears that her grouchy behavior was a result of pregnancy, and presents Donkey with their newborn hybrid children, the Dronkeys.

A silent character, Dragon has no spoken lines throughout the course of the franchise, though other characters, including Donkey, are able to somewhat understand her language when she communicates through hushed roars.

Dragon appears in all four Shrek films, Shrek the Halls and Shrek 4-D. She is notably absent from Scared Shrekless and Donkey's Christmas Shrektacular, and was not mentioned in the latter film.

The Gingerbread Man

The Gingerbread Man also known as Gingy (voiced by Conrad Vernon), is a live talking gingerbread man created by The Muffin Man and is one of Shrek's friends. He is small and a fast runner, making him difficult to catch. He is made out of a normal carved-out gingerbread with icing and gumdrop buttons. He adores those gumdrop buttons and begs Lord Farquaad (who tries to pull out one of his buttons) not to pull them off. In Shrek the Halls he is afraid of Santa, who has eaten his girlfriend.

In the first film, he is first seen when Lord Farquaad ordered his bodyguard Thelonious to torture him in numerous ways, such as cutting off both of his legs and dunking him in a glass of milk. After an interrogation from Farquaad, he is thrown into a trash can when the Magic Mirror arrives and Gingy yells "Don't tell him anything!"

He is impatient. In Shrek 2, for example, when Pinocchio could not move himself while freeing Shrek and the trio from prison, Gingy sighs, and goes to help. He is also somewhat wild, and a prankster. When Shrek and Fiona leave for Far Far Away, he and others have a loud party in his house. He is cunning and can distract others, such as when Lord Farquaad demands to know where the other fairy tale creatures are and he replies by reciting the Muffin Man nursery rhyme, which Farquaad believes for a moment.

In Shrek the Third, when Prince Charming takes over Far Far Away, he has Hook attempt to intimidate him to reveal Shrek's whereabouts. Instantly, Gingy's life flashes before his eyes, while in reality, he is mindlessly babbling away.

In Shrek Forever After, he is shown to have a dark, violent side. In an alternate universe with Rumpelstiltskin as king, he fights and kills gingerbread animals as a gladiator for a living. He also tries to attack and bring in Shrek for Rumpel, despite being so much smaller. He is eaten by an overweight Puss in Boots in the alternate universe, but is seen alive again at the ogre triplets' birthday party when the original timeline is restored.

Gingy makes a brief speaking cameo (still voiced by Conrad Vernon) in Puss in Boots: The Last Wish, where he is seen in one of the flashbacks which shows how Puss lost eight out of his nine lives.

Pinocchio
Pinocchio (voiced by Cody Cameron) is a live wooden puppet and one of Shrek's best friends. He can not lie without having his nose growing very long, and he deeply dreams to become a real boy.

In the first film, he is sold for five shillings by his creator, Geppetto. Later, Lord Farquaad banishes Pinocchio and others to Shrek's swamp. In Shrek 2, Pinocchio has become one of Shrek's best friends. He helps Shrek and Princess Fiona by guarding their swamp while they visit Far Far Away. He and the others later travel to Far Far Away to free Shrek, Puss In Boots, and Donkey, who have been captured. At one point during the rescue, Shrek and Donkey accidentally get him to reveal he is wearing a thong in an effort to grow his nose. They manage to get into the castle and stop the Fairy Godmother and Prince Charming. After trying to grab the Fairy Godmother's wand, she zaps him with it and he turns into a real boy, but when the wand is passed to The Three Blind Mice it transforms Pinocchio back into a puppet. He sings "Mr. Roboto" in Far Far Away Idol.

In Shrek the Third, Pinocchio attends Fiona's baby shower along with several other fairytale creatures, while Shrek, Donkey, and Puss In Boots are away. Charming and his followers crash the party and try to trick Pinocchio into telling them of Shrek's location, seeing that the puppet cannot lie; however, Pinocchio avoids this by talking in circles. When Shrek and his company return, they find Pinocchio imprisoned in a miniature theater, where he is forced to give marionette performances for paying customers. He is freed and helps to defeat Charming and the other evil fairytale creatures.

In Shrek Forever After, Pinocchio runs a library, in which Rumpelstiltskin is angrily tearing the pages of a book. Noticing that, he warns him that he has to pay for the damaged book. When Rumpelstiltskin tries to deceive him by offering him a deal to become a real boy, Pinocchio kicks him out of the library, calling him "Stinky-pants" before he slams the door. Later, in the alternate universe, he nearly signs a contract with Rumpelstiltskin to become a real boy, but ink is accidentally spilled over the document. He later tries to gain Rumpelstiltskin's "deal of a lifetime" by painting Geppetto green and passing him off as Shrek.

Pinocchio is a main character in Shrek SuperSlam, his Slam move being the Buzz Bomber. According to the story, Pinocchio works at Friar's Fat Boy. Pinocchio also appears as an unlockable racer in the game Shrek Smash n' Crash Racing. His kart is a wooden horse, and his personal item is his long nose.

In Scared Shrekless, he joins Shrek and the rest of his friends to tell scary stories in Farquaad's abandoned castle. He appears in the last story called "The Shreksorcist." In one part, he is acting to sleep and then Shrek cuts his strings using adult scissors causing him to fall on the bed and Pinocchio explains that he has voices in his head and Shrek asks what do the voices tell him to do and Pinocchio projectile vomits at Shrek. In the end, the voice in Pinocchio's head was a cricket who explains that he put all the thoughts in his head because he is his conscience, at which point Pinocchio steps on and crushes him.

He briefly has a speaking cameo (still voiced by Cody Cameron) in Puss in Boots: The Last Wish, in Jack Horner's flashback where he was a performer.

The Big Bad Wolf 
The Big Bad Wolf (voiced by Aron Warner in the films, James Arnold Taylor in the video games) is based loosely on the eponymous fairytale character, but differs from it by being a kind character. He rarely speaks, and when he does, his voice is somewhat dull and monotonous. He wears a pink dress, recalling the grandmother of Little Red Riding Hood. In the first film, he is among the fairy-tale creatures who are banished to Shrek's swamp.

In Shrek 2, he has become friends with Shrek and the others. In the film's intro, Prince Charming goes to Fiona's castle to rescue her but finds Wolf in her bed. He informs Charming that Fiona is on honeymoon with Shrek (Charming and Fairy Godmother mention this incident calling Wolf a 'gender-confused wolf'). He helps Shrek and Princess Fiona by guarding their swamp while they visit Far Far Away. He and the others later travel to Far Far Away to free Shrek, Puss In Boots and Donkey, who have been captured. After that, they get into the castle and stop the Fairy Godmother and Prince Charming.

In Shrek the Third, he and several other fairytale characters attend Fiona's baby shower while Shrek, Donkey, and Puss In Boots are away. When Charming and his evil followers crash the party, the Big Bad Wolf and the others stage a calm tea party. He also helps prevent Charming and the other evil fairytale creatures from killing Shrek in front of the entire kingdom.

He plays a small role in Shrek Forever After in the ogre triplets' birthday party and as Rumpelstiltskin's servant in the alternate universe.

In The Pig Who Cried Werewolf, it is shown that in the light of a full moon, he transforms—werewolf-style—into a fat, female human chef who wants to cook the Three Little Pigs. (Just as the full moon would transform a human into a werewolf, it apparently goes the other way with Wolf, transforming him into a human.)

He is not to be confused with the Death / Wolf character from Puss in Boots: The Last Wish.

Three Little Pigs
The Three Little Pigs (voiced by Cody Cameron) are friends of Shrek. In the original book and in the film, they are among the many fairytale creatures to be banished into Shrek's swamp by Lord Farquaad. The third of the three pigs stated that Lord Farquaad "huffed and puffed and signed an eviction notice." They all have German accents. They appear in all the Shrek films.

By Shrek 2, the pigs have become best friends with Shrek. At the start of the film, they help look after Shrek's and Fiona's house while they visit Far Far Away. Later, they see Shrek, Donkey and Puss In Boots arrested by local police officers in Far Far Away, and free them, heading to the castle to stop Prince Charming. They thwart the Fairy Godmother's scheme and then celebrate. They sing a song with Wolf in Far Far Away Idol.

The pigs are less prominent in the third film. They appear at the start of the film, where Prince Charming has a new job as an actor in a dinner theatre. Along with the rest of the crowd, they jeer him, causing Charming to leave the stage. They later appear in the castle pretending to have tea with the others while Shrek, Donkey and Puss In Boots are finding Artie, the heir to the throne, and Fiona, Queen Lillian and the princesses escape via a secret passage. Prince Charming storms in and demands Shrek's location. Under pressure when Pinocchio starts talking around in circles, the third of the three pigs accidentally reveals Shrek's plan and ends up locked up somewhere secret. The pigs are later freed and head to the castle to stop Prince Charming from killing Shrek in his show.

The Three Little Pigs play a small part in Shrek Forever After, when they appear at the ogre triplet's birthday party. Later, in the alternate universe, they appear as attendants to Fifi in Rumpelstiltskin's castle.

In Scared Shrekless, they appear after Gingy's story, running quickly and yelling "wee wee wee...", upon which the Wolf comments "They're gonna do that all the way home."

In the end credits for The Pig Who Cried Werewolf, it is revealed that their names are Heimlich, Dieter, and Horst. In this film, Heimlich and Dieter are voiced by Sean Bishop, not Cody Cameron, who voices Horst. Aron Warner still voices Wolf.

In Shrek The Musical, they have had enough of Lord Farquaad and his discrimination towards fairy tale creatures and join the rest of the fairy tale rebels in this story mainly appearing in "Story of My Life," "Freak Flag," "I'm a Believer," "This is Our Story," and any other numbers with the fairy tale creatures.

Three Blind Mice
The Three Blind Mice (voiced by Christopher Knights and Simon J. Smith in most films, Mike Myers in Shrek in the Swamp Karaoke Dance Party) are a trio of identical blind mice brothers with English accents that are friends with Shrek and the others. They are all blind, and that is why they sport black sunglasses and carry canes. Unlike in the fairy tale, their tails are not cut off and they do not display signs of injuries. Their names are Forder, Gorder and Horder.

At the beginning of the first film, Lord Farquaad banishes them to Shrek's swamp with the others. They are not seen again until the final musical number, "I'm a Believer", during which the fairies of Sleeping Beauty turn two of them into horses to pull a wagon made from an onion.

Before the start of Shrek 2, the Three Blind Mice have become three of Shrek's best friends. They help Shrek and Princess Fiona by guarding their swamp while they visit Far Far Away. They are later seen during the Royal Far Far Away Ball and again when Shrek (in his human form) is thrown into a police truck. On hearing this, the Blind Mice and the others travel to Far Far Away to free Shrek, Puss In Boots and Donkey. They then get into the castle and help to stop the Fairy Godmother and Prince Charming. They later appear in Far Far Away Idol, singing "I Can See Clearly Now."

In Shrek the Third, the Three Blind Mice only appear in two scenes: during the funeral of King Harold, and when Shrek is about to leave to find the new king of Far Far Away.

In Shrek Forever After, the mice are only seen in the normal universe.

Dronkeys
Dronkeys are the hybrid offspring of Dragon and Donkey. They are introduced in Shrek 2 as little more than a stinger gag. Audience members missed having Dragon in the film, as was revealed to the filmmakers during test screenings. Dragon reunites with Donkey in Far Far Away, only to have a surprise for him in tow—six young hybrid donkey-dragon children, who take to their father immediately. Donkey is delighted, and dubs the dronkeys "our little mutant babies". Their names are revealed to be Eclair, Bananas, Peanut, Parfait, Coco and Debbie.

The dronkeys have very little screen time in Shrek the Third. They appear initially to give Shrek a wake up call, then to bid farewell to Donkey before his journey with Shrek. Near the film's climax, Donkey frees them from Prince Charming's capture. In addition, a few dronkeys make an appearance at the film's close, when Shrek and Fiona are caring for their newborn triplets. In the alternate universe of Shrek Forever After, when Donkey is told he has children, he asks: "Are my babies cute, or do they just make people feel uncomfortable?"

The dronkeys provide background action in the Christmas television special. They are featured playing with the ogre children of Shrek and Fiona and flying around while their mother dances. They have antlers and fly around in Donkey's Christmas story. All the dronkeys love their parents, especially their father, and seem to have become good friends with the ogre triplets.

The only individual to be given any semblance of a personality is Bananas, who has bright green irises that are noticeably wall-eyed, and frequently sneezes small tongues of flame. Donkey refers to Bananas as his "special boy".

Some confusion exists as to why one dronkey is missing in Shrek The Third. When the dronkeys were first introduced in the post-credits scene of Shrek 2, there were six, including a unique individual which was red like her mother. She does not appear in Shrek the Third; this is seemingly a continuity error on the part of the filmmakers.

In Shrek Forever After, the dronkeys are seen playing with Shrek's children, appeared at their birthday and also a cause of nuisance for Shrek. They are not seen in the alternate universe as they do not exist on that timeline.

The Dronkeys were absent from Scared Shrekless, and neither were they mentioned.

Farkle, Fergus, and Felicia

Farkle, Fergus, and Felicia (also known as the Ogre Babies or Ogre Triplets) are the ogre children of Shrek and Princess Fiona. Farkle (indicated by the tuft of hair) and Fergus are male, and Felicia is female (indicated by a pink bow in her hair).

Just as many minor characters are members of the staff crew, the Ogre Triplets are voiced by offspring of staff crew, gender of voice not always same as actor: Jordan Alexander Hauser, Dante James Hauser, Jasper Johannes Andrews, Zachary James Bernard, Miles Christopher Bakshi, Nina Zoe Bakshi and Ollie Mitchell (son of Shrek Forever After director Mike Mitchell).

In Shrek 2 when Queen Lillian asks Shrek how he and Fiona will raise their family, Shrek insists it's too early to discuss this issue. In Shrek the Third, Fiona tries to talk Shrek into the possibility of parenthood by saying when they return to their swamp, there could be some little "ogre feet" too, but Shrek is too worried about his inexperience as a parent to pursue this idea right now. Just as Shrek embarks on a journey with Donkey and Puss in Boots to find Artie, Fiona announces to Shrek that she is pregnant, and Shrek begins to panic internally. During the journey, Shrek dreams of hundreds of ogre babies, constantly getting into danger and him having trouble saving them. In the dream, they flood Shrek's house and laugh at Shrek while he is naked apart from a graduation hat. He wakes up in another dream, where Donkey and Puss's faces have turned to that of the ogre babies. Shrek wakes up screaming and reveals to Puss and Donkey how shocked he is by this news. Donkey attempts to assure Shrek fatherhood will not ruin his life. Shrek says he is worried about ruining his child's life as ogres aren't known for being loving and nurturing. His fears prove to be well-founded when he reveals to Artie his own abusive father, who tried to eat him. By the end of the film, they have been born and are shown playing around the swamp, Shrek and Fiona getting used to being their parents, with the help of Puss, Lillian, Donkey and Dragon.

Two of them pull Puss's tail and put a pacifier into his mouth. Another pulls some ear wax from Shrek's ear and uses it to draw pictures with its left hand. Later that night, they are shown sleeping and snoring, all in one small baby cot. Shrek and Fiona constantly give them slug juice for drinks. The ogre babies are shown prominently in the credits, along with Puss in Boots and Donkey. Two of the siblings are shown to like Puss, hugging him tightly and call him "Kitty". Puss is displeased when they use him for tug-o-war.

They are seen more in Shrek the Halls, enjoying the seasons with their father and ecstatically enjoying their first Christmas with their parents. When Donkey brings the others to enjoy the holidays with them, the ogre babies hug Puss too tightly, pat his back, and tug on his tail. They enjoy various Christmas stories and get to see Santa Claus at the end.

The triplets do not appear in the alternate universe in Shrek Forever After as Shrek and Fiona meet, but do not marry in that universe. Shrek later finds Felicia's doll in his pocket, causing him to cry. As Shrek begins to fade away as his day is up, he tells Fiona about their children, just before she kisses him, restoring the timeline.

In Scared Shrekless, they appear at the beginning, scaring the trick or treaters in their skeleton costume. They are later seen along with their father, using the three in a knight armor in Duloc, to make Donkey believe that Lord Farquaad's ghost is there as a prank.

Queen Lillian
Queen Lillian (voiced by Julie Andrews) is the dowager queen of Far Far Away, widow of King Harold, mother of Princess Fiona, aunt of King Arthur Pendragon, grandmother of the ogre triplets, and mother-in-law of Shrek.

Queen Lillian makes her debut in Shrek 2. Although initially surprised at Fiona's transformation into an ogre, she is understanding of what has happened and, seeing that her daughter is deeply in love and happy, accepts Shrek into their family. When King Harold is turned back into the Frog King at the end of the film, she still accepts him as she did years ago. She and Harold are a reference to The Frog Prince.

In Shrek the Third, she is widowed and becomes a more determined character, leading the pack of princesses through a series of tunnels in the castle and breaking two walls with her head, whilst humming "My Favorite Things" and "A Spoonful of Sugar" (songs originally sung by Julie Andrews in The Sound of Music and Mary Poppins, respectively). She rallies the other princesses from being damsels in distress to independent fighters. It is revealed in the film that Fiona inherited her fighting skills from her mother (Lillian asks "Well, you didn't think you got your fighting skills from your father, did you?"). After the film's finale, Lillian is seen in Shrek's swamp home, happily visiting her grandchildren and playing with Farkle, who throws up on her dress. At first she is shocked, but this changes as she comes to find it adorable.

She appears at her grandchildren's birthday party in Shrek Forever After and gets angry when she thinks that it was Shrek who licked the birthday cake, when it in fact was Donkey. Lillian is also seen in a number of flashbacks, showing her and Harold's decision to visit Rumpelstiltskin to free their daughter from the curse before getting the news that she had been saved. In the alternate universe she and Harold disappear after signing over the kingdom to Rumpelstiltskin. Her last appearance is at the end of the film, still celebrating the children's birthday.

In Thriller Night, Shrek and his family watch The Music of Sound, starring Queen Lillian. This is a parody of The Sound of Music which starred Queen Lillian's voice actress, Julie Andrews.

King Harold
Harold (voiced by John Cleese) was the king consort of Far Far Away, late husband of Queen Lillian, late father of Princess Fiona, late uncle of King Arthur Pendragon, and late father-in-law of Shrek.

King Harold makes his debut in Shrek 2. When his daughter Fiona arrives at the castle with her new husband, he is surprised and appalled that they are both ogres. He had secretly made a promise to the Fairy Godmother that her son Prince Charming would marry Fiona. Harold hires Puss In Boots to assassinate Shrek, but then succumbs to guilt when Fiona finds out that Shrek is missing. When the Fairy Godmother asks Harold to give Fiona the potion that will cause her to fall in love with Prince Charming, he refuses at first, disgusted at this invasion of her free will, but he is forced to acquiesce by some dark threat of disclosure. In the event, when Fiona states that she loves the old Shrek, rather the new one that Prince Charming is pretending to be, Harold swaps the cup containing the potion for his own.

At the ball toward the end of the film, Harold saves Fiona and Shrek from a blast of magic from Fairy Godmother's wand, and it transforms him back into a frog, revealed to be his original form, the form he was in before he married Queen Lillian. Afterwards, Harold apologizes to Shrek and warmly accepts him into the family, and as he decides to leave believing that he is not the man Lillian deserved, she comforts him by saying that he is more that man now than he ever was when he was a human.

King Harold makes a final appearance as the frog king in Shrek the Third, in which Shrek and Fiona fill in for him and Lillian during his illness, which later turns out to be terminal (the story book The Legend of Shrek and other publications state that the transition from human to frog confused his age and accelerated the aging process). Shrek and Fiona both reject the idea of an ogre and ogress serving as king and a lady-in-waiting, given their inexperience and disastrous attempts to fill in for him.  Harold tells Shrek on his deathbed about Fiona's cousin Arthur is next in line for the throne of Far Far Away.  Harold dies shortly after telling Shrek and Fiona, and he is never seen nor heard from again.

King Harold makes his cameo appearance in Shrek Forever After, in which he appears very briefly in a couple of flashbacks only. In the first, he and Lillian are about to make a deal with Rumpelstiltskin, but they break it off at the last moment, after a royal messenger enters and informs them that Fiona has been saved. In the alternate reality of the second flashback, Harold and Lillian disappear after signing over the kingdom to Rumpelstiltskin. At the end of the film, the original timeline is restored, leaving the current time a year or so after Harold's death (as seen in Shrek the Third). However, there is a large painting of him as a human in which the face moves, possibly indicating that his spirit inhabits the picture. Unlike the previous films, he is never seen in his frog form.

King Arthur Pendragon
King Arthur Pendragon (voiced by Justin Timberlake in the film and James Arnold Taylor in the video game) is the current king of Far Far Away, cousin of Princess Fiona, cousin-in-law of Shrek, and nephew of widowed Queen Lillian and the late Harold. Arthur is a supporting character who only appears in Shrek the Third and is loosely based on King Arthur. He is the only heir apparent to the throne of Far Far Away. His father abandoned him at the high school Worcestershire, where he remains until Shrek finds him.

At Worcestershire, Arthur, nicknamed "Artie", is relentlessly bullied and made fun of by everyone, most notably the popular Lancelot. He is at first unsure when confronted with the trials of being king, but gets used to the idea and manages to convince people to his way of thinking when he defends and saves Shrek from the fairy tale villains. After Prince Charming's defeat, Shrek gives him the choice to do so, then Artie puts the crown on his head and begins his reign as King of Far Far Away.

Artie doesn't appear in Shrek Forever After and is never mentioned. He was supposed to appear, but Timberlake was unavailable to voice Artie because he was on tour, so he was absent from the film. DreamWorks decided having Artie appear in Shrek Forever After would not be a good idea.

Doris
Doris (voiced by Larry King in the US version and Jonathan Ross in the UK version of Shrek 2) makes her first appearance in Shrek 2 and returns in Shrek the Third and very briefly in Shrek Forever After. She is based on one of Cinderella's two stepsisters. Unlike the  other ugly sisters, she is an ally and best friend to Fiona. She is first seen as an unusually masculine female bartender at the Poison Apple. She is depicted as a tall, independent woman with purple-themed clothes who wears Elizabeth Taylor style makeup. Her character design is intended to invoke the appearance of a drag queen, which is supported with her masculine voice.

Doris is first seen in Shrek 2, when King Harold secretly enters the Poison Apple Club, in which she is working as a bartender. She recommends Puss In Boots to the king for the task of assassinating Shrek. Near the climax of the film, Doris directs King Harold to a door guarded by the Fairy Godmother's bodyguards, behind which Prince Charming and the Fairy Godmother are secretly meeting. At first, she has a crush on Prince Charming and forces him to kiss her at the end of the film. In Far Far Away Idol, she is accused by Simon Cowell of being ugly after she sings Cyndi Lauper's "Girls Just Wanna Have Fun".

In Shrek the Third, Doris becomes one of Shrek's friends before the events of the film. At the beginning of the film, Doris is briefly mentioned by Mabel when Prince Charming visits the Poison Apple. Mabel says that Doris does not belong here, and this indicates that Doris has reformed from villainy and sided with Shrek. She is also seen during Fiona's baby shower, but she escapes with the other princesses through a hidden trapdoor when Charming starts to enter the castle. Later, she is imprisoned by Charming after he invades Far Far Away. With the princesses, Donkey and Puss, she escapes and infiltrates the castle to confront Charming. In the end, Doris and Mabel finally meet in Charming's play and reconcile when Artie convinces the villains not to continue their villainous ways when they didn't get their happily ever after.

Doris appears very briefly in Shrek Forever After, working at The Happy Apple (formerly The Poison Apple) during the ogre triplets' birthday party.

Snow White
Snow White (voiced by Amy Poehler, singing voice provided by Megan Hilty) is one of Princess Fiona's friends. She has a talent for singing, which she uses to charm animals and make them follow her orders. She is shown to be very proud and vain, even boasting how she won Fairest In The Land from the Wicked Queen.

In the first film, Snow White cameos as one of the fairytale creatures to be banished to Shrek's swamp. She is shown sleeping inside her coffin and being handled by her seven dwarves. When Lord Farquaad is forced to choose a wife, Snow White, seen sleeping in the glass coffin, is his second choice. At Shrek and Fiona's wedding, she fights with Cinderella to catch Fiona's bouquet.

In Shrek 2, Snow White is briefly mentioned when the Fairy Godmother is explaining to Shrek that ogres do not live happily ever after.

Snow White appears more prominently in Shrek the Third, dressed in red. She becomes friends with Princess Fiona, Queen Lillian, Doris, Cinderella and the Sleeping Beauty before the events of the film. Prince Charming interrupts Fiona's baby shower after she gives her a dwarf as a gift to babysit the triplets, saying that she has six more at home. She escapes with Fiona, Queen Lillian, Doris and the other princesses. She is later betrayed by Rapunzel and imprisoned in a dungeon. She complains that they could just have stayed put and carried on with their normal routines (having tea parties and similarly stereotypical "girly" behavior), claiming to not care who is in charge. Later she is content just to wait to be rescued, as normal for fairytale princesses.

Fiona encourages her and the others to show some initiative, and they manage to escape and head towards the castle. She tricks the guards (talking trees) by singing a high tone (voiced by Megan Hilty) to charm the animals, and screaming (the same scream as in "The Immigrant Song" by Led Zeppelin) to command them to attack the trees. Her plan works and they enter the castle grounds, avoiding the knights guarding it. Snow White, along with the other princesses, Doris and Queen Lillian, arrives just in time to stop Prince Charming from killing Shrek. After Charming is defeated, she is seen in the background, talking to the other princesses, Doris and Queen Lillian.

Although it is unclear whether Snow White is married, at one point she is seen with a tattoo on her upper arm with the name Dopey surrounded by a heart.

Cinderella
Cinderella (voiced by Amy Sedaris) is one of Princess Fiona's friends. She wears her pair of glass slippers throughout the events of Shrek the Third. She uses her glass slipper as a weapon, somewhat like a boomerang. She is obsessed with cleanliness and tidiness after doing a great deal of housework for her stepmother and stepsisters (revealed to be Doris and Mabel).

In the Shrek 2 video game, however, she is portrayed as an absent-minded valley girl.

When Lord Farquaad is forced to choose his wife so that he can become king, Cinderella is one of his choices. She is shown at number 1 in a painting, wearing a yellow dress and trying on her glass slipper. However, Farquaad chooses Princess Fiona, ranked number 3. At Shrek and Fiona's wedding, Cinderella is shown fighting with Snow White to catch Fiona's bouquet.

In Shrek 2, Cinderella is briefly mentioned while the Fairy Godmother is explaining to Shrek that ogres do not live happily ever after. There is also a picture of her in Fairy Godmother's factory. This can be seen more clearly in a behind-the-scenes guide. Thus Fairy Godmother appears to be the evil twin sister of Cinderella's fairy godmother.

Cinderella appears more prominently in Shrek the Third, now wearing a light blue-silver dress. She becomes friends with Princess Fiona, Queen Lillian, Doris, Snow White and the Sleeping Beauty prior to the events of the film. She first appears in Fiona's baby shower, which Prince Charming interrupts when he takes over the throne. She escapes with Fiona, Queen Lillian, Doris, and the other princesses. She is later betrayed by Rapunzel and imprisoned with others in a dungeon. They escape and head towards the castle. After Snow White tricks the guards, they enter the castle's grounds and avoid the knights on guard. While trying to get into the castle, Cinderella hurls her glass slipper like a boomerang at a knight, knocking him out. Cinderella, with the other princesses, Doris and Queen Lillian, arrives just in time to stop Prince Charming from killing Shrek. After Charming is defeated, she is seen talking to the other princesses, Doris and Queen Lillian in the background.

Sleeping Beauty
Sleeping Beauty (voiced by Cheri Oteri) is one of Princess Fiona's friends. She likes to sleep a lot. Because she sleeps so much in the film, little is known about her personality, other than that she seems to be a pleasant person who is a little eccentric at times.

In Shrek 2, Sleeping Beauty is shown in a poorly drawn picture in Fiona's diary, explaining that Sleeping Beauty is having a party with all the other princesses, but Princess Fiona is not allowed to go, on account of the ogreish appearance she acquires every night. Later in the film, Sleeping Beauty appears without speaking when a coach-limousine pulls up at the red carpet to the Far Far Away Royal Ball. When the door opens, she falls to the ground, still sleeping. In the film, she wears a blue dress and a crown.

Sleeping Beauty appears more prominently in Shrek the Third, now wearing a white-green dress, and with light brown hair.  She becomes friends with Princess Fiona, Queen Lillian, Doris, Snow White and Cinderella before the events of the film. She first appears in Fiona's baby shower, but Prince Charming interrupts it and takes over the throne. She escapes with Fiona, Queen Lillian, Doris, and the other princesses. She is later betrayed by Rapunzel and imprisoned with others in a dungeon. They escape and head towards the castle.

After Snow White tricks the guards, they enter the castle's grounds, avoiding the knights on guard. While trying to get into the castle, Sleeping Beauty yawns and falls to the ground, causing the knights to trip over her and fall. With the other princesses, Doris and Queen Lillian, Sleeping Beauty arrives just in time to stop Prince Charming from killing Shrek. After Charming is defeated, she is seen talking to the other princesses, Doris and Queen Lillian in the background.

Merlin
Merlin (voiced by Eric Idle) is a retired wizard teacher from Artie's high school, Worcestershire, in Shrek the Third.

In Shrek the Third, after their ship crashes into sharp rocks, Shrek, Donkey, Puss and Artie get stranded on an island (possibly Lovers' Beach in Far Far Away). They meet Arthur's retired teacher Merlin, after Artie tries to separate himself from Shrek. Since Merlin retired because of a nervous breakdown (which he calls "third-level fatigue"), he seems rather eccentric, and his magic spells usually go wrong. At one point, when he prepares to teleport Shrek, Donkey, Puss and Artie to Far Far Away, he cracks his knuckles, only to fire a bolt that destroys a boulder.

To help Shrek and Arthur be reconciled, he makes them look into a thick cloud of smoke to reveal their thoughts. Shrek sees a baby carriage, but lies and says that he sees a "rainbow pony". Merlin is pleased and moves on to Arthur, who sees a bird and its father. The father bird abandons the chick, leaving it frightened and confused. Merlin is happy they decided to look into their soul, and as he retreats to his hut, Shrek takes the opportunity to show Arthur that they are not so different after all. They catch Merlin eavesdropping on their conversation when he plays the song "That's What Friends Are For" on a phonograph to add to the mood.

When Captain Hook and his cronies ambush Shrek, Donkey, Puss and Artie, he plays his piano, and Merlin is beside him playing it too until he is pushed away. After the villains retreat, Artie convinces Merlin to use a spell to teleport them to Far Far Away. But the spell causes Donkey and Puss to switch bodies (probably because they took each other's "hands" seconds before). After Prince Charming's defeat, Merlin returns, and Puss and Donkey force him to put them back in their own bodies. The spell works, but causes their tails to switch. Merlin tries to tell them, but decides not to, though their tails have inexplicably returned to normal later.

In the first film, he cameos as one of the fairy tale creatures banished to Shrek's swamp. He appears standing with the Big Bad Wolf and when Shrek asks if anyone knows Farquaad, they both point at each other. In the video game to the first Shrek film, a different version of Merlin kidnaps Fiona.

Magic Mirror
The Magic Mirror (voiced by Chris Miller) is a mirror with a live spirit communicating through it, and with magical displaying abilities.

It is first brought to Lord Farquaad who asks it if Duloc is not the most perfect kingdom, exactly the same way the Evil Queen used to ask it if she was not the fairest of all. The magic mirror explains that Lord Farquaad is not from a royal family so he cannot be king unless he marries a princess. It then presents Lord Farquaad with three princesses that he can marry: Cinderella, Snow White, and Princess Fiona, in which he chooses Fiona. However, the mirror also tries to warn Farquaad about Fiona's curse, but is ignored. Farquaad later uses it to constantly review the image of Fiona, in which it is now constantly worried.

It is later seen to be with Shrek's posse, who in Shrek 2 use it as a television set such as announcing that the show will be back after commercials.

In Shrek Forever After, Rumpelstiltskin has it and uses it on television broadcasting purposes. In the ending, he is seen shining a light on a giant disco ball.

Brogan
Brogan (voiced by Jon Hamm) is an ogre and the second-in-command of the Ogre Resistance in Shrek Forever After. He uses his nose as their horn to communicate music. He's got really short, almost invisible, ginger hair and unshaven face. He's nice, kind and loyal. He is taller, bigger, more muscular and much more handsome than Shrek. He's possibly the strongest one of all ogres, because when the witches carry up all of the ogres with their Skull Chains, Brogan is too strong and he pulls the Skull Chains that are attached to him, so the Witches fall from their broomsticks.

Brogan introduces Shrek into the resistance and is seen in the meeting with Fiona on how to fight against Rumpelstiltskin and the witches. When Pied Piper arrives and uses his flute, the song "Shake Your Groove Thing" is played, and Brogan cannot stop dancing. Later, he and the other ogres are captured, but they fight in the castle and defeat Rumpelstiltskin. He is also seen at the party in the end of the film.

In the audio commentary for the DVD release, Mike Mitchell states Brogan was originally meant to be Prince Charming, Fiona's love interest with the same curse as her, called "Gnimrahc", which is Charming spelled backwards.

Cookie
Cookie (voiced by Craig Robinson) is an ogre and a chef for the Ogre Resistance in Shrek Forever After. Food is his only weapon against the witches and Rumpelstiltskin. His signature dish is the chimichanga, of which he takes a cartful to the ambush of Rumpelstiltskin. Cookie is very recognizable due to the garlic he has tied into his goatee and a chef hat. He is a very outgoing and friendly ogre. He is the only ogre to enjoy dancing while Pied Piper plays his flute until he and the others are captured. He catapults his chimichangas at the witches during the final battle. He is also seen at the party in the end of the film.

Gretched
Gretched (voiced by Jane Lynch) is a female ogre who appears in the Shrek Forever After. She is a member of the Ogre Resistance. She is one of the strong soldiers and she plays an important role in the Ogre Resistance. She is more of a stereotypical ogre as opposed to kind and delicate like Fiona, looking and behaving closer to like that of the other male ogres. She is also seen at the party in the end of the film.

Humpty Dumpty
Humpty Alexander Dumpty (voiced by Zach Galifianakis), in his childhood, was best friends with Puss and tried to find magic beans with him. However, their quest failed and Puss later became a revered hero in their hometown. Humpty grew jealous of Puss's fame and later tricked him into helping him rob a bank, thus branding Puss an outlaw. They were pursued by the authorities; Humpty was captured while Puss escaped. Seven years later, Humpty along with Kitty Softpaws convinced Puss to help him get magic beans from Jack and Jill to get the Golden Goose, but it was revealed that this was all a plot to just get Puss back home and arrested as revenge for abandoning him. But later Humpty had a change of heart and helped Puss and Kitty tame The Great Terror. In the end, he sacrifices himself to save San Ricardo and falls from the bridge, upon which his shell is broken, revealing him to be a golden egg.

In Shrek Super Slam, he is known as Master Fu and is an unlockable character. In Shrek 4-D, his grave can be seen in the cemetery.

Puss in Boots mentions him in Puss in Boots: The Three Diablos. His name also appears in a fairy tale book found by Goldilocks in Puss in Boots: The Last Wish.

Perrito
Perrito (voiced by Harvey Guillén) is a therapy dog to Puss in Boots. He started out as one of Mama Luna’s pet cats, because he disguised himself as a cat. He met Puss, and they became fast friends, at least in Perrito's eyes. He then followed Puss and Kitty to find the Last Wish before Goldilocks and "Big" Jack Horner, even though he himself didn't have a wish of his own. Through their journey, he would ultimately touch the hearts of the cats and fully form their unity, known as "Team Friendship". Puss and Kitty suggest he picks a name for himself, and he goes with Perrito because "that's what my friends call me".

Goldilocks
Goldilocks (voiced by 	Florence Pugh) is an orphan, who has been adopted by the three bears.

In Puss in Boots: The Last Wish, Goldilocks, known as Goldi by her adoptive family and rivals, is a fierce and determined young woman, seeking what she wants with great fervor and having a liking for things to be "just right". Goldi leads her adoptive family, the Three Bears, as their self-appointed leader, supported by Papa and Mama Bear while Baby Bear tends to butt heads with her, and they bicker like all brothers and sisters do. She often has to keep her adoptive parents focused on the task at hand and often orders Baby to sniff out their quarry since he has the best sense of smell. She secretly wishes to use the Wishing Star to wish for a human family, but eventually changes her mind when she realizes the Three Bears are her family.

Three Bears Crime Family
The Three Bears (voiced by Ray Winstone, Olivia Colman, and Samson Kayo) are Goldilocks' adoptive family. Papa Bear has a scarred face, but is shown to be jovial and caring towards his family; Mama Bear is gentle and protective most of the time, and often tries to get the family to accept things as they are without a wish; Baby, who is now grown up and seems to harbor some resentment towards Goldilocks for joining their family, spends much of the film bickering with her as they call each other names, but eventually is revealed to also care for his adoptive sister as well. It is unclear whether these bears are connected to the three bears shown being captured by Lord Farquaad's men in Shrek. 

In Puss in Boots: The Last Wish, The Three Bears appear when they and Goldilocks, presented as a crime family, break into Mama Luna's house looking for Puss. After Baby finds Puss' "grave", Goldi and the three bears sets out for Jack Horner's pastry shop, to steal the map to the magical Wishing Star, as Goldi claims she has a secret wish that will make their lives better. They have many adventures trying to steal the map from Horner, Puss in Boots and Kitty Softpaws; eventually, Goldi breaks the bears' hearts by admitting her wish is to have her human family back, though they decide to help her anyway if it would make her happy. Later, Goldi forfeits the wish to save Baby's life when he is caught in the magical barrier surrounding the wishing star, and the bears reaffirm their bond with her as her true family. After Horner is defeated, the bears and Goldi set out to take over Horner's pie factory and hibernate for the winter.

The Ethical Bug
The Ethical Bug (voiced by Kevin McCann) is a small, but slightly overgrown green bug with a brown cap and overalls. He has six limbs with two being used as arms, and four being used as legs which have brown shoes. His eyes are large and shaped like ping-pong balls. He has wings for floating around, and antennas which do not have much function. (The character's name and personality are modeled after a humorous take on Jiminy Cricket from Disney's Pinocchio.) He attempts to give "Big" Jack Horner ethical advice over the film but is often ignored and mocked by the villain. Once the Bug comes to terms with how vile Horner truly is, the Bug arrives with a phoenix, who burns a piece of the map, destroying it. Later, he offers to give advice on "ethical business practices" to Goldi and The Three Bears (Baby Bear calls him "a talking cockroach").

Mama Luna
Mama Luna (voiced by Da'Vine Joy Randolph) is a Cat Lady who owns Mama Luna’s Cat Rescue.

Main villains

Lord Farquaad

Lord Farquaad (voiced by John Lithgow in the films, Andre Sogliuzzo in Shrek Smash n' Crash Racing) is the narcissistic, ruthless and diminutive ruler of the huge castle of Duloc.

In his pursuit of perfection, Farquaad attempts to rid his domain of fairy tale creatures, offering a bounty for their capture and then exiling them to Shrek's swamp. Farquaad wants to become a king, but because he is not of royal blood, he cannot until he marries a princess. He decides that Princess Fiona will be his perfect wife and queen, but first she must be rescued from her tower, which is guarded by a fire-breathing dragon.

Unwilling to perform the rescue himself, Farquaad holds a tournament to select the knight that will rescue Princess Fiona. But Shrek and Donkey turn up and defeat the knights, so Farquaad decides to send Shrek on the quest instead, agreeing to remove the fairytale creatures from his swamp if he rescues Fiona. Shrek delivers Fiona to Farquaad, who immediately proposes marriage, unaware that she becomes an ogress at sunset. Shrek disrupts the marriage ceremony, delaying a kiss between Farquaad and Fiona until after sunset.

Fiona makes the transition from human to ogre form, upon which Farquaad rejects his new bride, banishing her back to the tower, still claiming the title of king and sentencing Shrek to death. However, before Farquaad finishes his claims to the kingdom, Shrek whistles to summon Dragon, who has since developed a relationship with Donkey, and she crashes through the window and devours the monologing Farquaad. Moments later, Dragon burps and the crown comes out of her mouth. Although he seemed to be feared and respected, Farquaad was apparently not well liked in Duloc, as when Dragon eats him, the citizens laugh and cheer.

In Shrek 4D he tries to murder Shrek and Donkey and to kidnap and kill Fiona so that she can be his queen in the afterlife. Princess Fiona is again rescued when Lord Farquaad is presumably killed by Dragon a second time. In Scared Shrekless, Farquaad is long dead, and his castle left in a decrepit state.

Lord Farquaad does not appear, nor is he mentioned in Shrek 2, but he briefly appears in Gingy's flashbacks in Shrek the Third.

In Shrek the Musical, it is revealed that Lord Farquaad's mother was the princess from the fairy tale The Princess and the Pea. Also, Lord Farquaad's father was Grumpy of the Seven Dwarfs. Farquaad claimed earlier that Grumpy abandoned him in the woods as a child, but Grumpy reveals the true reason he kicked Farquaad out is that he was 28 years old and wouldn't move out of his basement as revealed when he and the other fairy tale characters raid Lord Farquaad's wedding.

Fairy Godmother

The Fairy Godmother (voiced by Jennifer Saunders in the films, Claudia Christian in the video games, and Pinky Turzo in Thriller Night), is a scheming, conniving opportunist, loosely based on the fairy-tale Cinderella's "Fairy Godmother". She seeks to get the best for herself and her son Prince Charming, rather than others. She takes an instant dislike to Shrek, and when he tries to ask her why Fiona is not happy, she rudely points out that "ogres don't live happily ever after." She then briefly insults Shrek, calling his fingers "dirty green sausages." She often resorts to blackmail and trickery through magic to get her way. She is a stress eater ("someone get me something deep fried and smothered in chocolate," when Shrek makes a mess of her potion factory, and during her talk with Harold in the carriage about Shrek, it is shown that Harold ruined her diet when she orders food from Friar's Fat Boy). It is a popular theory that she placed the spell on Fiona that makes her turn into an ogre at night as part of her plan to get Charming to marry her.

Bubbles are her character's main theme. In her first appearance, she is surrounded by bubbles as she sings to Fiona. When Shrek uses her card to ask for help, a voice mail message of her appears with her saying "Is it on? Is it on?" she is again surrounded by a bubble, which then shows an image of the Fairy Godmother's cottage. After the message ends, the bubble bursts. Finally when the Fairy Godmother dies, in an attempt to cast a spell to kill Shrek which is deflected onto her by King Harold's armor, she bursts into a host of bubbles. Her death later influences Charming to get revenge by taking over Far Far Away.

Although The Fairy Godmother doesn't appear in Shrek the Third, she is mentioned numerous times by Prince Charming.

The Fairy Godmother is briefly mentioned by Lillian and Harold in the opening scene of Shrek Forever After and makes a cameo during the end credits.

Prince Charming
Prince Charming (voiced by Rupert Everett in the second and third film, Sean Bishop in Scared Shrekless, James Arnold Taylor in video games) is the son of the Fairy Godmother. He is very handsome and was supposed to rescue Princess Fiona from her dragon-guarded tower.

In his first scene in Shrek 2, he travels to the castle where Fiona had been imprisoned prior to the first film, only to discover that Shrek has already found and married her and that the Big Bad Wolf has taken to sleeping in her tower. It is later revealed that Charming is the son of the Fairy Godmother and that she wants him to marry Fiona so that he can become king. In contrast to his fairytale namesake, Prince Charming is characterized as an arrogant, vain and spoiled mama's boy, and she as his doting parent, as well as shallow about his appearance. He later deceives Fiona into believing that he is Shrek, having been turned human by a "Happily Ever After" potion. His heartless attitude shows through the disguise and Fiona realizes the truth, knocking him unconscious with a headbutt. At the end of the film, he is forcefully kissed by the ugly stepsister Doris.

He sings "I'm Too Sexy" by "Right Said Fred" in Far Far Away Idol, but because of his poor singing, Fiona presses a button that opens a trap door below him and he falls into it. He is voiced here by Randy Crenshaw.

In Shrek the Third, Charming gathers all the evil characters from fairy tales that were at the Poison Apple Bar to get their revenge and their own "Happily Ever Afters". After they invade the main castle of Far Far Away, Charming prepares a stage show in which he will kill Shrek in front of the entire kingdom. Shrek takes part in the show, but his allies come to the rescue. Arthur Pendragon then convinces the fairytale villains to give up their evil ways. Charming is furious and attacks Artie only to be stopped by Shrek, who throws him towards a prop tower made of stone. Dragon purposely knocks the scenographic tower over and it lands on Charming, without, however, killing him.

He appears in Scared Shrekless, in the story "Boots Motel" (made up by Donkey and Puss). This time, he is voiced by Sean Bishop.

He appears as a zombie in Shrek's nightmare and later at the theater sitting among the public, in Thriller Night, a Shrek parody of the short film Michael Jackson's Thriller.

Rupert Everett's name appears in the cast list for Shrek Forever After, but Prince Charming has only a non-speaking cameo in the film, during the end credits. Charming's status in the alternate timeline is left unknown along with the reason why he never rescued Fiona.

Rumpelstiltskin
Rumpelstiltskin (voiced by Conrad Vernon in Shrek the Third, Walt Dohrn in subsequent media) is an evil short con man who makes magical deals (complete with contracts), but give them a horrible twist in fate for their lives. He has a giant pet goose named Fifi.

In Shrek the Third, a different version of Rumpelstiltskin decides to join Prince Charming as an attempt for the other villains to get their happily ever after. And as with the other villains, this Rumpelstiltskin decided to quit being a villain.

In Shrek Forever After, the story begins during the time frame of the first Shrek film. King Harold and Queen Lillian are about to sign their kingdom over to Rumpelstiltskin to break Fiona's curse, as Lilian believes that the Fairy Godmother cannot be trusted, though Harold is reluctant to trust Rumpelstiltskin. At the last moment, they learn that Fiona has been rescued from the tower and do not sign the contract. Rumpelstiltskin is then furious and vows revenge on Shrek.

The setting then moves forward to after Shrek the Third. Seeing Shrek missing his old life as a free and terrifying ogre, Rumpelstiltskin makes a deal with him, tricking him into giving up the day he was born. This deal enables Rumpelstiltskin to be the ruler of Far Far Away by creating an alternate reality in which Shrek never existed and therefore never rescued Fiona, thus causing the king and queen to sign the contract which gave him their kingdom. Shrek tries to reverse the deal by using the exit clause - a true love's kiss - before 24 hours elapse and he disappears forever. Though this is proved difficult because in this reality, Fiona is a leader of a band of rebel ogres and takes an immediate dislike to Shrek, whom she does not know. Rumpelstiltskin has an army of witches to stop him and hires the Pied Piper to capture him and the other ogres. He succeeds in capturing all but Shrek and Fiona. When he offers anything in return for the one who brings Shrek to him, Shrek turns himself in, and in exchange has Rumpelstiltskin set the ogres free (though he keeps Fiona, as she is a human by day and therefore not completely an ogre). Rumpelstiltskin looses Dragon (who is still feral in this reality) on Shrek and Fiona, but Puss, Donkey and the other ogres come to fight, and with Shrek and Fiona they defeat Rumpelstiltskin and his army of witches. By this time Shrek's 24 hours are almost up, but at the last second, Fiona kisses the fading Shrek, whom she now realizes that she loves, thus restoring the original reality. Rumpelstiltskin is last seen during the ending, imprisoned in a cage by Shrek, Fiona and the other ogres, while Fifi explodes at Fiona's high-note singing, Rumpelstilskin is also tormented by the Pied Piper who makes him dance in his cage.

In Donkey's Christmas Shrektacular, Rumpelstiltskin is still imprisoned in a cage and receives coal for Christmas. He appears twice in Shrek's Yule Log, out of his cage and unsuccessfully trying to put out the fireplace.

Jack and Jill
Jack and Jill (voiced by Billy Bob Thornton and Amy Sedaris) are a married couple.

In Puss in Boots, Jack and Jill are in the possession of the magic beans from the Jack and the Beanstalk story, which Puss, Kitty Softpaws and Humpty Dumpty manage to steal to get into the giant's keep. However, it is revealed later that Jack and Jill were in cahoots with Humpty and Kitty to take the Golden Goose and trick Puss into being imprisoned in his home town. But when the Great Terror arrives to retrieve Golden Goose, its baby, Jack and Jill try to steal the Goose when Humpty had a change of heart and tried to help Puss lure the Great Terror away from San Ricardo, only for the couple to be stomped on by the Terror. During the credits, Jack and Jill are seen in full body casts.

Throughout the film, Jack tries convincing Jill that they should start a family, but after Jill's persistent refusal of having a baby, he happily compromises with Jill in assuming the role of taking care of their piglets, both especially showing a particular fondness for one piglet named "Hamhock".

In Shrek 2, a thinner Jill is one of three women shown ogling a newly human Shrek, mentioning Jack as having gone to fetch a pail of water, not recognizing Puss in Boots.

Jack Horner
Jack Horner (voiced by John Mulaney) used to be called Little Jack Horner, when he was young, and now is grown-up and called Big Jack Horner.

In Puss in Boots: The Last Wish, "Big" Jack Horner is taste-testing his company's latest pie batch when he is joined by the Serpent Sisters, who have brought him the map to the Wishing Star. Horner takes them to his trophy room where he shows them all the magical memorabilia he has collected over the years, calling them "trinkets" compared to the Wishing Star; he started collecting them when, as a child, his non-magical nursery rhyme character status caused him to be overshadowed by magical fairy tale creatures, making him jealous. He is completely selfish and immoral, happily admitting as much to the Ethical Bug and other characters; he has no respect for the sanctity of life, allowing all of his henchmen to die to protect himself (sometimes killing them himself) and refusing to help anyone. His greatest wish is to control all magic in the universe. Jack also admits that, apart from his jealousy of magical creatures, he had a very happy, prosperous, and stable childhood, giving him no real motivations for his actions other than pure selfishness. He makes several efforts throughout the film to control the star and its map, but is constantly thwarted. He is eventually killed when several characters destroy the Wishing Star's map, which causes the star itself to consume Jack (who was standing on it at the time) and explode.

Jack wields a bottomless magic "nanny bag", filled with weaponized objects from fairy tales, including (but not limited to) a crossbow that fires unicorn horns, poison apples that act as grenades, magic potions, a wizard's staff, Excalibur, and the Ethical Bug.

Wolf / Death
Wolf / Death (voiced by Wagner Moura, also called "[the] Big Bad Wolf” in marketing  but nowhere in the film) is the embodiment of Death itself. He appears as a large, white-furred, red-eyed wolf with a black poncho and black trousers.

In Puss in Boots: The Last Wish, Death is a cunning, sarcastic, sinister individual whose purpose is to take the souls of the deceased. Although he is usually content to wait for people to die naturally, if someone annoys him enough, he will physically manifest and attempt to take their life by force. He is very offended by the way Puss wasted his extra lives; he therefore pursues Puss and repeatedly challenges him to battle. In his first fight with Puss, Death effortlessly disarms him and claims his rapier, scaring the cat enough to decide to retire. During their second encounter, Death reveals his identity to Puss in the Cave of Lost Souls, and once again makes the cat run off in fear. During their third encounter on the Wishing Star, Death surrounds the area between him and Puss with a ring of fire so Puss cannot flee and tosses him his sword. This time, Puss musters up the courage to fight the wolf and manages to hold him off. Though Puss knows he can never truly defeat Death, he promises that he will never stop fighting for his last life. After expressing frustration at himself for "playing with his food,"  Death admits Puss has learned his lesson, and begrudgingly allows him to live out his life. He warns Puss they will meet again, which Puss respectfully acknowledges. Satisfied, Death also nods in respect and leaves. 

Death wields twin sickles that can combine into a double-bladed glaive; the blades can also fold over the handles for storage or as knuckle blades. He can summon flames and is capable of appearing from nothing if he chooses to.

Minor villains

Thelonious
Thelonious (voiced by Christopher Knights) appears as one of Lord Farquaad's henchmen, the torturer and possibly the executioner, as he's the one who tortures Gingy by breaking his legs and dunking him in the milk and threatens the Magic Mirror to break it by Lord Farquaad's order. His face is always covered by the hood, a theory is that his hood is actually his own head and face, but he also wears a tight costume that emphasizes his muscles and crotch. He has poor intelligence, as shown when Lord Farquaad is deciding between three princesses and Thelonious says "Three! Pick number three, my lord" while holding up two fingers. He's later seen at Fiona and Farquaad's wedding and it is assumed that he isn't actually villanous, because when they kiss, he wrote "Aawww" on one of the signs that are telling people how should they react to different situations. He's also seen in the ending, at Shrek and Fiona's wedding, when he helps to play the music organ. He also makes a cameo appearance in Shrek Forever After, but only during the credits (showing a slide show of clips from the last 3 Shrek films).

He also appears in Shrek 4-D or The Ghost of Lord Farquaad, where he kidnaps Fiona so the spirit of Farquaad can kill her and make her his spirit queen. But when the reluctant Thelonious released the raft to send Fiona over a waterfall, he forgot to get off of it first. He accepted Fiona punching his face multiple times, believing he deserved it. When she finds her punches doesn't hurt him, with him even twitching his head like a zombie, she kicks Thelonious hard between his legs, his only weakness, by stepping on the wooden beam of the raft. After he  collapsed in pain and fell overboard, she apologized to him. Then he fell from the waterfall but grabbed onto a branch. When Fiona, Shrek and Donkey fell from the waterfall as well, he proved he is good, because he caught them all in one hand while still held the branch by the other until the branch broke. They all fell down the waterfall, but the Dragon rescued all of them and finishes Lord Farquaad for good, sending him back to the underworld. Thelonious becomes the first Shrek films villain or minion (if we don' count the Dragon) to change to good, despite the fact that he's never been really villanous in the first place but more of a dimwitted sidekick acting the way he did more out of loyalty in the first film and out of fear in the short toward Lord Farquaad.

Rapunzel
Rapunzel (voiced by Maya Rudolph) is one of Princess Fiona's former friends. She is snobbish, opinionated, vain, and does not seem to get along with the bossy Snow White.

In Shrek the Third, Rapunzel is first seen during Fiona's baby shower, until Prince Charming invades the castle and the princesses, Doris and Queen Lillian escape secretly. Rapunzel pretends to find an exit and runs all the way to where Charming really is. The princesses, Doris and Lillian follow but are cornered by Charming's knights. Rapunzel then betrays them and shows off her love and affection for the Prince, while the other women are imprisoned in a dungeon with Rapunzel telling Prince Charming not to have any harm come to them. While they are there, Rapunzel practices for her role in Prince Charming's play. In the final performance, she sings and acts as a princess on top of a tower (mimicking Princess Fiona, whose situation itself mimics Rapunzel's). The play is interrupted by Shrek's friends and Fiona. Gingy comes on stage by holding on to Rapunzel's hair, which he accidentally pulls off. When it is revealed that she is actually bald, Rapunzel gasps in horror and runs from the stage out of embarrassment.

Captain Hook
Captain Hook (voiced by Ian McShane in the third film) appears in Shrek 2 in the bar of the Poison Apple, where he plays the piano and sings "Little Drop of Poison" (his singing voice during that song was provided by Tom Waits) and "People Just Ain't No Good" (his singing voice during that song was provided by Nick Cave) in the other. He appears in Shrek the Third, working for Prince Charming. When Artie convinces the villains to give up evil, Hook states that he grows daffodils and they are beautiful. Captain Hook is the first who throws his weapon down and becomes good.

Captain Hook also appears as a contestant in the Far Far Away Idol feature on the Shrek 2 DVD with his singing voice provided by Matt Mahaffey. He begins to sing "Hooked On A Feeling" until Tinkerbell (whom Hook poisons in the classic Peter Pan story) prompts Simon Cowell to remove him from the stage.

Captain Hook does not appear in Shrek Forever After directly, but his voice is heard in the soundtrack, and he makes a cameo in the book opening of the film holding some daffodils.

Cyclops
The Cyclops (voiced by Mark Valley) is the bouncer for the Poison Apple as seen in Shrek 2.

He appears in Shrek Super Slam, and his slam is "Eye in the Sky".

In Shrek the Third, the Cyclops is seen on a Bucking Bronco at the Poison Apple Bar when Prince Charming comes in. The Cyclops is among the villains that help Prince Charming take over Far Far Away. He has a daughter, a cute little cyclops girl who also has only one eye who he brings with him as part of "Take Your Daughter to Work Day." He is a family man and does not really want to be evil. He even apologizes to Shrek when he hits him too hard. His idea of "pillaging" during the attack on Far Far Away isn't exactly the most evil either, as he is only seen ripping the stamps off the letters in a mailbox.

Various other cyclopes like him appear in the Shrek the Third video game, but it is unknown if he is there or not.

Mabel the Ugly Stepsister
Mabel (voiced by Regis Philbin) is the sister of Doris and the stepsister of Cinderella. She first appears in Shrek the Third, where she assists Prince Charming in his plan to take over Far Far Away. She is chubby and wears green-themed clothes. Like Doris, she is a kind-hearted person.

Mabel is first seen when, at the bar of the Poison Apple, Prince Charming asks her where Doris is. Mabel, who has taken Doris's place as bartender, replies "She's not welcome here." (In fact, Doris is now friends with Shrek and Princess Fiona.) Like Doris, Mabel has a crush on Prince Charming. At the film's climax, she meets Doris on stage after the tower prop falls on Prince Charming and they reconcile.

Mabel appears two times in Shrek Forever After, first time at the ogre triplets' birthday party where she tells Shrek that he forgot the candles for the birthday cake and second time where she grew old as one of the viewers of Rumpelstiltskin's message in the alternate reality.

The Evil Gnomes
The Evil Gnomes are gnomes who wear dark clothes and sport black beards. They appeared briefly in the second film and more prominent in the third.

In Shrek 2, two Evil Gnomes are shown wrestling with each other.

In Shrek the Third, the Evil Gnomes help Prince Charming in his plot to take over Far Far Away.

The Evil Trees
The Evil Trees are a group of mobile wicked trees. Appearing briefly in the second film and more prominently in the third. In Shrek 2 the two Evil Trees has been seen doing "branch wrestling" while one breaks the branch of the other. In Shrek the Third the two Evil Trees (played by Andrew Birch and Christopher Knights) help Prince Charming in his plot to take over Far Far Away. In one scene of the third film, their names are revealed to be Ed and Steve. In the same scene, they explain that it is hard to find work since most of the world is against them. The other Evil Trees are dropped into Far Far Away during the Evil Witches' air raid.

The trees are possibly two of the living trees from The Wonderful Wizard of Oz.

The evil trees appear in the Shrek Forever After video game.

The Evil Queen
The Evil Queen (voiced by Susan Blakeslee) appears in the third Shrek film where she assists Prince Charming in taking over Far Far Away when Prince Charming visits the Poison Apple bar. Prince Charming refers to her as the "Wicked Witch." When she is about to kill Queen Lillian (with a sword to her neck), Artie asserts they all can all stop being evil if they are willing to make a better choice. The Evil Queen happily says that she always wants to open a spa in France and is last seen hugging her step-daughter Snow White.

Stromboli the Puppet Master
Stromboli the Puppet Master (voiced by Chris Miller) appears in Shrek the Third where Prince Charming convinces him to join his brigade by describing how Pinocchio has gone to look for his "real" father and never returned. His only line is "I hate that little wooden puppet".

Headless Horseman
Headless Horseman (voiced by Conrad Vernon) makes a cameo appearance in the Poisoned Apple during the second film and appears in the third film with Prince Charming in his invasion of villains. He seems to be a good friend of Captain Hook. He reveals that he has "always wanted to play the flute" (which would be difficult at best since he has no head).

Fifi
Fifi is Rumpelstiltskin's giant pet goose. She is also his bodyguard and carriage puller and attacks Shrek and Donkey at one point. During the ending credits, Fiona sings a high note, causing Fifi to explode alongside the bluebird, a homage to a scene from the first film.

Fifi does not appear in Puss in Boots, but The Great Terror looks a lot like her.

Witches
In Shrek the Third, some Witches are shown as patrons at the bar of the Poison Apple (one of them was seen singing at the Poison Apple Bar) when Prince Charming rallies the fairytale villains to take over Far Far Away. The witches carry out an air raid, dropping the evil trees from there to attack the citizens.

Some witches are among Rumpelstiltskin's main assistants in Shrek Forever After, wearing black coats and having long noses and greenish faces. They ride their broomsticks and use pumpkins as bombs. They can be killed by water, as Rumpelstiltskin does to one of them, who cries "Oh, what a world! What a world!", like the Wicked Witch of the West from The Wizard of Oz. Some of them are seen dancing modern hip hop moves to the Pied Piper's flute after they ridicule him. They are defeated in the final battle. Although most of them display vicious behavior for most of the film, they passively surrender once Rumpelstiltskin is captured and are even shown to be sorry for Fiona when Shrek disappears. Near the end, they have reformed and made a rainbow out of clouds. Baba and Griselda are the only witches whose names are mentioned.

The witches in Shrek Forever After are voiced by Billie Hayes, Kristen Schaal, Mary Kay Place, Meredith Vieira, Kathy Griffin, Mike Mitchell and Lake Bell.

Monsieur Robin Hood
"Monsieur Robin Hood" (voiced by Vincent Cassel) is a French-accented version of Robin Hood who appears in the first Shrek film. Believing that Shrek had kidnapped Princess Fiona, he and his Merry Men burst upon them and introduce themselves with an accordion-backed song and dance number describing how he intends to save Fiona and slay Shrek. She finds his song very "annoying" and cuts him off by knocking him to the ground, then defeats his entire band with her kung-fu skills, greatly impressing Shrek. Robin is portrayed as more of a confused nuisance than a threatening villain, as he genuinely believed that Shrek was going to harm Fiona. He and the Merry Men attend Shrek and Fiona's wedding, indicating that there was no real malice.

Robin Hood and his Merry Men appear in Shrek Super Slam as unlockable characters. They also appear in the Swamp Karaoke Dance Party in the end of the film, joining with Shrek, Princess Fiona, Donkey, Snow White, Pinocchio, Thelonious, Papa Bear, Cinderella, the Big Bad Wolf, and others for a huge dance (they sing "Y.M.C.A.").

Sir Lancelot
Sir Lancelot (voiced by John Krasinski) is one of Arthur's classmates in high school. The captain of the school's jousting team. He's got thick black hair and square jaw. He's very handsome, well-built and sexy, but also really rude, arrogant and narcissistic. He is the quintessential Big Man on Campus and a typical jock — he loves sport, he has got many fans and he tends to abuse his popularity. Lancelot is portrayed as more of a bully than a threatening villain. He takes every opportunity to assert his superiority over his classmates, whether through a sarcastic comeback or a beating on the jousting field. The main recipient of such thrashings is Artie, because Lancelot is much more muscular, handsome and stronger than him. He wins against him during jousting, so Shrek mistakes him for Artie, who doesn't look like a king. He is possibly Guinevere's boyfriend.

The Black Knight
The gibberish-speaking Black Knight (voiced by Max Koch) appears in black armor and a red cape in Shrek Super Slam. He is available as a standard character and his slam is the "Seismic Smash".

In "Shrek the Third," there were some black knights that helped Prince Charming in a plot to kill Shrek

The Pied Piper
The Pied Piper appears briefly in the first film, among the fairy tale creatures exiled in Shrek's swamp, where he rallies many rats with his enchanted flute.

In Shrek Forever After, he is hired by Rumpelstiltskin to capture the ogres by forcing them to dance and follow him with his enchanted flute. He can handle different species (rats, ogres, witches...) or even objects (Rumpelstiltskin's socks) by setting the "target" dial of his flute. He never speaks, only using his flute to communicate. The Piper has no real voice, but the flute performance was done by Jeremy Steig (original author William Steig's son).

In Shrek Forever After he is seen playing two pop culture songs: at first he plays Sure Shot, to make the witches dance after their mockery of him, and later he plays Shake Your Groove Thing, to make the ogres dance directly to Rumpelstiltskin's castle.

Raoul
Raoul (voiced by Conrad Vernon) appears in Puss in Boots. He is a hairy thief and thug. He has multiple tattoos: three beans on his arm, beanstalk reaching the castle in the sky on his chest, golden goose on his back, and golden eggs probably on his genitals (when he offered Puss to show that tattoo, he unzipped his trousers).

He is first seen in the bar where he is drinking and laughing at the cat along with the other thieves. He tells Puss the story about the Golden Goose and Jack and Jill, and illustrates his tale by taking off his shirt and revealing his tattoos. He also tries to rob Puss, but then Puss cuts off half of his beard.

Later, we learn that he was in cahoots with Humpty to take the Golden Goose and trick Puss into being imprisoned in his home town. After the Giant Terror flies down to take the Golden Goose back, Raoul is found in his home, bathing and playing with a rubber duck. Through his window, the Giant Terror spots the tattoo on his back. Enraged, she throws his bathtub into the air. It is unknown if he died or survived.

Minor characters

The Muffin Man
Jero the Muffin Man (voiced by Conrad Vernon) is a baker who lives in Far Far Away.

He is mentioned briefly in the first Shrek film when Gingy and Lord Farquaad discuss their knowledge of him, speaking in the words of the nursery rhyme.

 He first appears in Shrek 2, when Shrek and Gingy persuade him to bake an enormous gingerbread man named Mongo. Mongo helps the heroes to storm King Harold's castle during the Wedding Ball.

In Shrek the Third, the Muffin Man is revealed to be a father figure to Gingy, who calls him "Papa". As in the nursery rhyme, he lives on Drury Lane.

He appears in Shrek Forever After as a baker on birthday party. In the reality in which Shrek wasn't born, Gingy is seen fighting Animal Crackers and the Muffin Man is seen as a bookie saying "Place your bets!" He also appears in the scene when Rumpelstiltskin promises anyone's heart's desire if they give him Shrek.

Furniture
The Furniture that are in Fiona's bedroom first appeared in Shrek 2. They are brought to life by Fairy Godmother's magic to sing and dance with her and provide Fiona with the needs of being a princess but to Fairy Godmother and their surprise, she didn't need the requirements and are more shocked to learn that she's married to an ogre named Shrek. Later, they temporarily come back to life and (under Fairy Godmother's orders) block the exits to prevent Shrek from escaping Fiona's room. Afterwards, they no longer speak or move.

They return in Shrek the Third, but are no longer alive (presumably due to Fairy Godmother's death); however, they still play a specific role in the film.

Guinevere
Guinevere (voiced by Latifa Ouaou) is a love interest of Arthur's. When he reveals this, she replies with "ew". She's possibly Lancelot's girlfriend. She chews bubble gum.

Imelda
Imelda (voiced by Constance Marie) was Puss' surrogate mother, Mama Imelda, head of orphanage who decides to take in and raise Puss as her own son (along with Humpty Dumpty and possibly others). She is the one who proudly gives Puss his iconic boots. She appears prominently in Puss in Boots and briefly in flashbacks in Puss in Boots: The Last Wish.

Golden Goose
The Golden Goose in Puss in Boots looks more like a giant gosling even being titled as the golden goose and even when she's too young, she lays solid golden eggs and is determined to fly as she flaps her wings.

Great Terror
The Great Terror is a giant white goose with golden feathers. She is the mother of the Golden Goose who used to be owned by Giants.

She is very similar to Fifi from Shrek Forever After.

Suzie
Suzie (voiced by Susan Fitzer) was a gingerbread girl and Gingy's girlfriend that appears briefly in Gingy's flashbacks in the third film and also in Gingy's flashback story in Shrek the Halls. In Shrek the Third, she has been seen kissing with Gingy in a car at a drive-in cinema. In Shrek the Halls in Gingy's Christmas story, he recounts a Christmas winter night he spent with her. The two were in a car made of bread and candies parked on a table, which made them seem like cookies left out for Santa Claus, who later tries to eat them. The gingerbread couple attempted to run, but Suzie was caught by Santa, and she was eaten after letting out a scream. Her death was shown to be the cause of Gingy's fear of Santa.

Sugar
Sugar (voiced by Kristen Schaal) is a gingerbread girl made up as Gingy's love interest in Gingy's (fictional) story "The Bride of Gingy." in Scared Shrekless. She became Gingy's girlfriend when Gingy explains to the Muffin Man that his other girlfriend kicked him out because he only cared about himself. To that, he makes Gingy a new girlfriend. Gingy thought of adding much sugar to the gingerbread batter to make his girlfriend really sweet, despite the Muffin Man's objections. Once Sugar is born, she falls in love with Gingy. At first, Gingy is overjoyed, but gets uncomfortable with Sugar becoming overly attached to him. He finally escapes and gets over it by knocking her into the mixer which created thousands of zombie clones of herself that attacked Gingy and ate him.

Other characters

Cyclops Girl 
She is Cyclops's beautiful little daughter who appears briefly in Shrek the Third and loves her father. Her father brings his sweet little cyclops to work on "Bring Your Kids To Work Day", where Shrek is surprised to see her, but then gives the little cyclops a rub on the head and a compliment, telling her father "She's got your eye".

Hansel and Gretel 
Hansel and Gretel appear in the second film's royal ball, walking on the red carpet and happy about Fiona's wedding. They appear to throw bread on the ground, puzzling the Joan Rivers-like commentator at the ball. They are also mentioned by the Fairy Godmother while she finds that ogres don't live happily ever after.

Little Boy Blue 
He grew up alongside Puss in Boots and Humpty Dumpty in the San Ricardo Orphanage and bullied the latter. His skin is blue.

He looks very similar to Butter Pants from Shrek Forever After.

Little Red Riding Hood 
Little Red Riding Hood is shown at the beginning of Shrek 2, coming to the gingerbread and cake house (from Hansel and Gretel) and running away leaving her basket behind after seeing Shrek and Fiona as ogres.

She also appears in Shrek 2: The Game being voiced by Tara Strong, and as a professional softball pitcher. Her slam is Basket of Utter Destruction. She has a different appearance in the two productions.

In Shrek the Third, Little Red Riding Hood was seen pickpocketing someone. She appears as a racer in the game Shrek Smash n' Crash Racing. Her name in it is simply "Red Riding Hood", but her appearance is the same as in Shrek 2. Her kart is the Big Bad Wolf, and her personal item is a picnic basket.

Mister Geppetto 
Mr. Geppetto (voiced by Chris Miller in Shrek and Shrek Forever After and by Sean Bishop in Scared Shrekless) is Pinocchio's father. He is seen selling Pinocchio to Farquaad's army in the first film.

In Shrek Forever After Pinocchio tries to pass him off to Rumpelstiltskin as Shrek.

Miss Toad 
Miss Toad (voiced by Wendy Bilanski) is seen at the Poison Apple Bar in the second film. She could be the toad that kidnapped Thumbelina.

Seven Dwarfs 
Snow White's seven dwarves appear in the first film carrying Snow White's coffin. When they place the coffin on the table, Shrek says "Oh no! Dead broad off the table." One of the Dwarfs responds "Where else are we supposed to put it? The bed's already been taken" as Shrek finds the Big Bad Wolf in his bed.

They are seen again in Shrek 2, when they give Shrek a ring engraved with "I love you" in flaming letters for Fiona (in an allusion to the One Ring from The Lord of the Rings). In "Shrek the Third", one of them (Grumpy) is given to Fiona at her baby shower (as a babysitter) from Snow White who says she has six more at home. He is later seen again after the birth to babysit, only to be turned away by Shrek. They are seen at the end of Scared Shrekless when Shrek and Fiona celebrate by egging them. They have been voiced by various actors including Elisa Gabrielli, David P. Smith, Walt Dohrn, and Sean Bishop. In Shrek The Musical, it is revealed that Grumpy was the father of Lord Farquaad who kicked him out of his house because he was 28 and living in his basement.

The Little Mermaid 
A mermaid resembling Ariel from the Disney film The Little Mermaid makes a cameo appearance during the "Accidentally in Love" scene in Shrek 2, when Shrek and Fiona are on the beach during their honeymoon. A wave comes in and then goes back out, leaving her on top of Shrek, kissing him. Fiona throws her back into the sea, where she is attacked by sharks (Her fate is unknown)

The Old Lady in the Shoe 
Her house is seen when Lord Farquaad consigns all the fairytale characters to Shrek's swamp. She was under the shoe with her children.

Peter Pan 
Peter Pan (voiced by Michael Galasso) is seen in the first film waiting in line to sell Tinker Bell. His only line in the film is "He can fly!" (delivered when Tinker Bell inadvertently sprinkles fairy dust on Donkey).

In Shrek the Third, Captain Hook mistakes a small boy in Far Far Away for Peter Pan where he quotes to his mother "Shut it Wendy" thinking that she is Wendy. Peter Pan is also a character in Shrek The Musical, that is banished to Shrek's swamp.

Tinker Bell 
Tinker Bell is almost sold by Peter Pan in the first film, and it is her "fairy dust" that allows Donkey to fly temporarily. In Shrek 2 she dances with Gingy during the Far Far Away Idol and is jarred and used as lighting for a mud bath with 17 other fairies. Things then become worse for the fairies, as Shrek and Fiona are then farting in the mud, which the fairies wave away. She uses her magic to turn Puss's boots into dancing ones during the Far Far Away Idols. She is also a player in the Shrek 2 video game, helping to rescue Shrek, Donkey and Puss alongside Little Red Riding Hood, the Big Bad Wolf and the Gingerbread Man.

In the game Shrek Smash n' Crash Racing, she makes a cameo in the Potion Factory Exterior Track. She is the purple fairy that flies across the track, and if any character hits her, they will spin out.

The Three Bears (Shrek) 
Papa Bear, Mama Bear, and Baby Bear (voiced by Bobby Block) appear in the first film among the fairytale characters captured by Lord Farquaad's troops as Baby Bear tells his parents "This cage is too small." They are among the fairy tale character that are sent to Shrek's swamp, and in the party at the end of the film. They also appear in Shrek the Musical, and are banished to Shrek's swamp.

In the game Shrek Superslam, there is a bearskin rug (most likely Mama Bear, as there was a bow on her head) in one of the secret arenas. Also, in the game Shrek Smash n' Crash Racing, Papa Bear is used as a kart for Goldilocks, but he's not a playable character.

It's unclear if these are connected, if at all, to The Three Bears and Goldilocks crime family from Puss in Boots: The Last Wish. The most notably disputed character is Mama Bear, who wears the same exact bow in both characterizations, but appears to have been seemingly killed and turned into a rug by Lord Farquaad in the first Shrek film.

Tom Thumb and Thumbelina 
Tom Thumb and Thumbelina walk together on the red carpet at Fiona and Shrek's wedding ball. They are both ignominiously swept up with the debris cluttering the red carpet, and they fail to attend the ball. Tom Thumb pushes Thumbelina in front of him as they are swept up.

Captain of the Guards 
The Captain of the Guard (voiced by Jim Cummings in Shrek and Andrew Adamson in Shrek 2) first appears in the first film  as the commander of Farquaad's army and his personal aide. A similar character reappears in Shrek 2 but is now the head of King Harold's army.

Quasimodo 
Quasimodo (voiced by Nolan North) appears in Shrek SuperSlam where he moves in next door to Shrek's swamp. He plays his bells at 4:00 AM while Shrek and Fiona are trying to sleep. When he won't stop playing his bells, this leads to Shrek and Fiona fighting him.

Frog 
While Shrek and Fiona are falling in love, Shrek grabs the Frog and makes it a balloon for Fiona. He (or a frog resembling him) appears again in Shrek 4-D, where he grabs Tinker Bell with his tongue and attempts to swallow her in the opening scene. She then escapes from his mouth, and flies around with his tongue still stuck to her.

Appearing in Shrek the Musical
The following characters appear in Shrek the Musical:

Shrek's parents
Shrek's ogre parents appear at the beginning of the musical. They send Shrek out of their home at his seventh birthday, for him to live by himself.  Shrek's father was mentioned in Shrek the Third when Shrek talks with Artie about their fathers, according to Shrek in that scene, his father tried to eat him.

Fairy Godmother
A Fairy Godmother different from the one seen in Shrek 2 appears in Shrek the Musical and is banished to Shrek's swamp.

Gnome
A Gnome appears in the Seattle Try-out & Broadway Line-Up of Shrek the Musical amongst the fairy tale characters that are banished to Shrek's swamp.

Mad Hatter
The Mad Hatter appears in the West End Line-Up version of Shrek the Musical amongst the fairy tale characters that are banished to Shrek's swamp.

Shoemaker's Elf
Based on one of the elves from The Elves and the Shoemaker, it appears in the Seattle Try-out & Broadway Line-Up and US National Tour Line-Up versions of Shrek the Musical amongst the fairy tale characters that are banished to Shrek's swamp.

Sugarplum Fairy
Based on the Sugarplum Fairies from The Nutcracker, the Sugarplum Fairy appears in all three versions of Shrek the Musical amongst the fairy tale characters that are banished to Shrek's swamp.

The Ugly Duckling
The Ugly Duckling appeared in all three versions of Shrek the Musical amongst the fairy tale characters that are banished to Shrek's swamp.

Tweedledum and Tweedledee
Tweedledum and Tweedledee appear in the West End Line-Up version of Shrek the Musical amongst the fairy tale characters that are banished to Shrek's swamp.

White Rabbit
The White Rabbit appeared in the Seattle Try-out & Broadway Line-Up and West End Line-Up versions of Shrek the Musical amongst the fairy tale characters that are banished to Shrek's swamp.

The Cow Who Jumped Over the Moon
The Cow Who Jumped Over the Moon appears in the Travel Song where she jumps over the moon as Shrek and Donkey walk on their way to rescue Fiona.

The character is mentioned in "The Pig Who Cried Werewolf" when The Three Little Pigs remember when Heimlich claimed that he has seen an UFO, but Dieter says that was just The Cow Who Jumped Over The Moon.

The Dish and the Spoon
The Dish and the Spoon appear in the Travel Song where they run away as Shrek and Donkey walk on their way to rescue Fiona. The Dish and the Spoon are having a conversation and somehow being pursued by the police, it is unknown if they escaped or got arrested.

Notes

References

 list
Lists of animated film characters
Animated characters by series
Universal Pictures cartoons and characters